Viroflay is a commune in the Yvelines department in the Île-de-France in north-central France.

The town motto is Lux mea lex which is Latin for "Light is my law".

History

Population

Gastronomy 
The "Viroflay Omelette" is an omelette stuffed with spinach, ham and gruyère cheese.
The "Monstruous" is a variety of spinach, specific to Viroflay where it used to be cultivated.

Transport 
Viroflay is served by Viroflay-Rive-Gauche station, which is an interchange station on Paris RER line C and on the Transilien Paris-Montparnasse suburban rail line.

It is also served by Viroflay-Rive-Droite station on the Transilien Paris-Saint-Lazare suburban rail line and by Chaville–Vélizy station on Paris RER line C.

See also 
 Communes of the Yvelines department

References

External links 
 Official site

Communes of Yvelines